The National Music Prize (Premi Nacional de Música) is one of the National Arts Awards awarded annually by the Generalitat of Catalonia. The prize money is 18,000 euros.

Previous winners
1992 - Vallès Symphony Orchestra
1993 - Victoria de los Ángeles
1994 - Manuel Oltra i Ferrer
1995 - Joan Guinjoan
1996 - Montserrat Torrent
1997 - Xavier Montsalvatge
1998 - Anna Ricci
1999 - Joaquim Homs
2000 - Josep Maria Mestres Quadreny
2001 - Josep Soler i Sardà
2002 - Joan Albert Amargós
2003 - Montserrat Caballé
2004 - Alicia de Larrocha
2005 - Toti Soler
2006 - Orfeó Català
2007 - Benet Casablancas
2008 - Antònia Font
2009 - Jordi Savall
2010 - Jordi Cervelló
2011 - Miguel Poveda
2012 - Pere Camps

References

Spanish music awards